Nathaniel Napier may refer to:

Nathaniel Napier (died 1635), MP
Sir Nathaniel Napier, 2nd Baronet, MP for Dorchester and Corfe Castle 
Sir Nathaniel Napier, 3rd Baronet, MP for Dorchester